The Himalayan buzzard (Buteo refectus) is a medium to large bird of prey that is sometimes considered a subspecies of the widespread common buzzard (Buteo buteo). It is native to the Himalayas in Nepal, India and adjacent mountains of southern China.

It was formerly given the scientific name Buteo burmanicus, but this name is now known to have been previously applied to the migratory mainland Asian subspecies of the eastern buzzard (B. japonicus burmanicus), and the Himalayan buzzard was thus renamed Buteo refectus.

References

 Clements, J. F., T. S. Schulenberg, M. J. Iliff, B.L. Sullivan, C. L. Wood, and D. Roberson. 2011. The Clements checklist of birds of the world: Version 6.6. Downloaded from https://web.archive.org/web/20100821172048/http://www.birds.cornell.edu/clementschecklist/downloadable-clements-checklist

External links

 Videos

Buteo
Birds of prey
Birds described in 1935
Birds of Nepal